Lee Sang-yeob (born May 8, 1983) is a South Korean actor. He is best known for starring in the sitcom Living Among the Rich (2011–12), the melodrama  The Innocent Man (2012), the period drama Jang Ok-jung, Living by Love (2013), and the fantasy drama While You Were Sleeping (2017).
Lee was cast in his first leading role in the weekend drama A Little Love Never Hurts (2013). He recently gained immense recognition for portraying the role of Yoon Gyu-jin in the weekend drama Once Again (2020).

Personal life
Lee is the only grandson of the late businessman Kim Jong-jin, who served in executive positions at POSCO and Dongkuk Steel. In August 2013, he admitted he had been in a relationship with Gong Hyun-joo for half a year and affection began when they were colleagues in the same agency. In August 2016, the agency announced they broke up due to personal reasons. They changed agencies respectively after their break-up.

Filmography

Film

Television series

Web series

Television show

Web shows

Hosting

Soundtrack appearances

Ambassadorship 
 Ambassador of Public Relations for the Anti-Conflict of Interest Act (2022)

Awards and nominations

References

External links
 
 
 

1983 births
IHQ (company) artists
Living people
People from Seoul
Male actors from Seoul
Hanyang University alumni
South Korean male television actors
South Korean male film actors
21st-century South Korean male actors